The big-scaled redfin (Tribolodon hakonensis), also known as the Japanese dace and ugui, is a medium-sized Asian fish. First described by Albert Günther in 1877 as Leuciscus hakonensis, it is the type specimen of the genus Tribolodon, having been described again as Tribolodon punctatum by Henri Émile Sauvage when he established that genus in 1883. It is the most widely distributed of the Tribolodon species, found over much of the Sea of Japan. It is known to carry a number of parasites, including the trematode species Centrocestus armatus (for which it is a second intermediate host), and the copepod species Ergasilus fidiformis, which is carried in the fish's gills.

References

Tribolodon
Fish described in 1877
Taxa named by Albert Günther